Amanda Barrie  (born Shirley Anne Broadbent; 14 September 1935) is an English actress. She appeared in two of the Carry On films before being cast as Alma Halliwell in ITV soap opera, Coronation Street, which she played on and off for 20 years. Between 2003 and 2006, she played the role of Bev Tull in the ITV prison drama, Bad Girls. She has since enjoyed a varied stage and television career.

Early life and education
Barrie was born Shirley Anne Broadbent in Ashton-under-Lyne, Lancashire, to Hubert Broadbent and his wife Connie (née Pyke). Barrie attended St Anne's College, Lytham St Annes, then trained at the Arts Educational School in London and later at Bristol Old Vic Theatre School.

Career
Barrie appeared in pantomime as a child and was a dancer before working for many years as a chorus girl in the West End until her first break as an actress came along. At sixteen she danced at the Windsor Club with Danny La Rue and Barbara Windsor, changing her name before making her West End debut in 1961's Babes in the Wood. Throughout the 1960s, Barrie worked on many stage productions including Cabaret, Private Lives, Hobson's Choice and Aladdin She made her screen debut in the comedy film Operation Bullshine in 1959 leading to roles in popular films including What a Whopper and Doctor in Distress. Barrie then starred in two of the Carry On films, a long-running series of British comedy films: she had a supporting part as a cab driver in Carry On Cabby (1963) and took the title role in Carry On Cleo (1964). In 1965, Barrie starred alongside Billy Fury in his film I've Gotta Horse. Barrie continued to appear in many television series into the 1970s as well as presenting Hickory House with former Coronation Street star Alan Rothwell between 1973 and 1977. In 1975, Barrie played Mrs. B.J. Spence in the Walt Disney film One of Our Dinosaurs Is Missing. After roles in a string of one-off television plays and series, she appeared in a guest role as a ballet mistress in the popular BBC comedy series Are You Being Served? in 1979. In 1982, she starred alongside Brian Murphy in L for Lester, a sitcom about a driving instructor.

Barrie is well known as Alma Sedgewick (later Baldwin), in Coronation Street. She was a bit-player in the early to mid-1980s before she was offered a contract in 1988, after which her character became high-profile. She continued in the role until her departure in 2001. In the story, Alma was diagnosed with cervical cancer which later caused her death. Since leaving Coronation Street, Barrie has continued to act, firstly as Margo Phillips in the long-running BBC medical soap opera Doctors for nine episodes, and in the popular ITV1 prison series Bad Girls, playing inmate Bev Tull from the fifth series to the last, along with Phyl Oswyn played by Stephanie Beacham. The characters together were known as "The Costa Cons".

She also became one of the celebrities who took part in Hell's Kitchen and attempted to slap Gordon Ramsay in the face. In 2005 she appeared as the Wicked Witch of the West in a pantomime adaptation of The Wizard of Oz at an Oxford theatre.  She appeared on a pantomime edition of The Weakest Link dressed as the witch to raise money for charity but she was voted off in the second round. From November 2006 to January 2007, Barrie took a starring role in the pantomime adaptation of Jack and the Beanstalk in Canterbury. From December 2007 to January 2008, she appeared as the Fairy Godmother in the pantomime adaptation of Cinderella at the Gordon Craig Theatre in Stevenage, Hertfordshire. From December 2008 to January 2009, she played the Fairy Godmother in Cinderella at the Grand Theatre, Blackpool. She again played the role from December 2009 to January 2010 in Rhyl. In December 2010 and January 2011 she played the role in Bournemouth. She played role again from December 2011 to January 2012 in Worthing. On Tuesday 7 August 2012 she appeared in the BBC drama Holby City as troubled, sassy, failed actress Annabella Casey. She again played the Fairy Godmother in Cinderella at the Marina Theatre in Lowestoft from December 2013 to January 2014.

In June 2014, Barrie returned to the set of Coronation Street for a 30-minute documentary entitled, Gail & Me: 40 Years on Coronation Street, and was reunited with former co-stars and friends. From 2015 to 2017, Barrie had a recurring role as a fortune teller nicknamed Psychic Sue in the popular sitcom Benidorm. In 2015, she starred in the film Tea for Two alongside John Challis as a couple who run a tea room, before having a role in the 2018 drama film Together with Sylvia Syms and Peter Bowles. In January 2018, Barrie took part in Celebrity Big Brother.

In the summer of 2019 she appeared in series 2 of Celebrity 5 Go Barging, exploring canals around Staffordshire and Warwickshire by narrowboat.

Personal life
Barrie had a relationship with singer Billy Fury in the mid-1960s after they met while filming I've Gotta Horse. Fury proposed to her, but she did not accept.

In 1967, Barrie married theatre director and actor Robin Hunter. They separated in the mid-1980s, but never divorced; he died in 2004. The couple had no children. She came out as bisexual in her autobiography It's Not a Rehearsal. On 12 September 2014, she married her long-term partner Hilary Bonner. The couple live in homes in the Blackdown Hills, Somerset, and London.

Barrie is a distant cousin of Coronation Street co-star Sally Ann Matthews, who plays Jenny Bradley.

Stage and screen credits

Film

Television

Stage

References

External links

1935 births
Living people
English film actresses
English soap opera actresses
English stage actresses
English LGBT actors
English television actresses
English bisexual people
Bisexual actresses
People from Ashton-under-Lyne
Actresses from Lancashire
20th-century English actresses
21st-century English actresses
20th-century English LGBT people
21st-century English LGBT people